"Love" is a song by American R&B recording artist Keyshia Cole. It was written by Greg Curtis and Keyshia Cole and produced the former for her debut album, The Way It Is (2005). "Love" was released on January 6, 2006, as the album's fourth and final single and emerged as the most successful single from the album. It peaked at number 19 on the US Billboard Hot 100 chart and number three on the Hot R&B/Hip-Hop Songs chart, going on to become her breakthrough record after a string of modestly successful singles. "Love" was certified platinum by the RIAA.

Background
"Love" was written by Cole along with producer Greg Curtis. When she moved to Los Angeles in pursuit of a record deal, "Love" was the track that she thought stood the best chance of getting her signed to a label. When she met with A&M Records President Ron Fair, she performed the song, and Fair signed Cole on the spot.

The track tells the story of a girl who is always trying to do her best for her boyfriend, even though she believes that she is never good enough. The lyrics read: "I used to think that I wasn't fine enough and I used to think I wasn't wild enough but I won't waste my time tryin' to figure out why you are playin' games what's this all about?" The song describes the boyfriend's infidelity and Cole's struggle to believe it because she is madly in love with him.

Chart performance
"Love" debuted on the US Billboard Hot 100 at number 82 and rose to number 49 in its second week, becoming the chart's "Greatest Gainer." It slowly moved up the charts with minor setbacks, and eventually reached position 19, becoming Cole's most successful solo charting single up to then until her 2007 song "Let It Go" reached position seven. "Love" also pekaed at number three on the Hot R&B/Hip-Hop Songs chart. Billboard ranked 18th on its 2006 R&B/Hip-Hop Songs year-end chart. "Love" was eventually certified platinum by the Recording Industry Association of America (RIAA).

Music video

An accompanying music video for "Love" was directed by Benny Boom. R&B singer Tyrese appears as Cole's boyfriend in the video which was largely shot in various New York City locations. The clip starts as two policemen pull over Cole and Tyrese after she allegedly ran a red light though she denies the accusation. Tyrese appears to be living a double life. Although Cole suspects that he is a criminal, she never confronts him since he gives the impression of being a loving boyfriend. As Cole is watching television, a video of her boyfriend and some other men robbing a bank appears on the screen. After she arrives home from a day of lavish shopping, Cole is confronted by the authorities who ask her if she knows the whereabouts of her boyfriend. Her boyfriend then picks her up, she gets into the driver's seat of the car, and we are taken back to the scene shown at the beginning of the video. In this take, however, the policeman recognizes that it is Cole and calmly calls the whole thing off by asking for her autograph. Cole confronts her boyfriend about his criminality and decides to stay with him when he pledges to give up his life of crime to be with her. Frequently aired on BET's countdown show, 106 and Park, the video made the countdown for 65 days before it was retired on April 19, 2006.

O.T. Genasis version

In December 2019, rapper O.T. Genasis released a reworked version of "Love" titled "Never Knew." The song caused controversy when Cole expressed disapproval of the track, saying, "I would like my classics to be left alone." She also questioned how she would get paid when O.T. Genasis made "new lyrics and you ain't sent me out a check or anything like that." Genasis went on to troll Cole on his Instagram, and after his version was removed from YouTube, he uploaded the song to Pornhub.  Genasis's version was re-uploaded to YouTube at a later date.

Other covers 
"Love" has also been covered by various other artists including Avery Wilson, Bruno Mars, Dondria, Coco Jones, H.E.R, Kehlani and Queen Naija.

Track listings

Notes
  signifies an additional producer

Credits and personnel 
Credits adapted from the liner notes of The Way It Is.

J.D. Andrew – engineer
Ariel Choraz – assistant engineer
Keyshia Cole – writer
Greg Curtis – engineer, producer, writer
D. Elliott – additional producer
Ron Fair – additional producer, engineer
Tal Herzberg – additional producer, engineer
Dave Pensado – engineer

Charts

Weekly charts

Year-end charts

Certifications

References

2006 singles
Keyshia Cole songs
Music videos directed by Benny Boom
Contemporary R&B ballads
Song recordings produced by Ron Fair
Soul ballads
2005 songs
Songs written by Kanye West
Songs written by Keyshia Cole
A&M Records singles
2000s ballads